Michele Ferrarin (born 11 August 1971) is an Italian paratriathlete and swimmer. Born in Verona, he represented Italy at the 2016 Summer Paralympics in Rio de Janeiro, Brazil and he won the silver medal in the men's PT2 event. He also represented Italy at the 2012 Summer Paralympics in London, United Kingdom in swimming without winning a medal.

References

External links
 

Living people
1971 births
Sportspeople from Verona
Italian male triathletes
Paratriathletes of Italy
Paratriathletes at the 2016 Summer Paralympics
Medalists at the 2016 Summer Paralympics
Paralympic silver medalists for Italy
Paralympic medalists in paratriathlon
People with spinal muscular atrophy
Paralympic athletes of Fiamme Oro
20th-century Italian people
21st-century Italian people